Wersten is a quarter (Stadtteil) of Düsseldorf located in Borough 9 of the city. It is south of Eller and Oberbilk, east of Bilk, and north of Holthausen. It has been a part of Düsseldorf since 1909.

History

Wersten was mentioned in writing for the first time in 1063 as 'Werstine'.
In 1218 it was mentioned under the name 'Warstein'.
In 1360 it was given to the administration of Monheim.

After Napoleon reordered the West of the German-Roman Empire, Wersten got part of the Mairie Benrath, in the Canton Richrath, Arrondissement Düsseldorf.

Later, after the Duchy of Berg fell to Prussia in 1815, Wersten was still part of the Mayoralty of Benrath.
In 1909 the citizens of Wersten reached their aim to become a part of Düsseldorf, because in that way they got electricity and city gas a few years earlier than settlements outside of Düsseldorf.

Sights

 Südpark park area former belonging to the Bundesgartenschau (Federal garden exhibition of Germany)
 Roman Catholic Church St. Maria Rosenkranz, neoromanic basilika.
 Roman Catholic Franz-von-Sales-Church, modern church
 Roman Catholic Church St. Maria in den Benden, modern church
 Protestant Stephanuskirche, modern church
 Botanic Garden of Düsseldorf University

Infrastructure

 Federal Highway connection to the A 46 (Neuss-Düsseldorf-Wuppertal)
 Federal road B 8
 Underground lines U 71, U 74, U 77 and U 83
 Bus lines 723, 724, 735, 780, 782 und 785
 Express bus line SB 50

Economy

The Provinzial Insurance Company has its main office in Düsseldorf-Wersten.
The rest of the economy in Wersten is based on smaller companies.

References

Urban districts and boroughs of Düsseldorf